The siege of Urviventus or Siege of Urbs Vetus took place during Justinian I's Gothic War. The Byzantine commander Belisarius dispatched a strong force to take Urviventus, himself marching on Urbinus. 1,000 Goths under Albilas had been sent to defend the city. Belisarius, after capturing Urbinus, reinforced the besieging army. He assessed the situation, deciding the town could not be taken by storm. When the town ran out of supplies the defenders surrendered.

References

Gothic War (535–554)
Urviventus
538
Urviventus
530s conflicts